Ari David Greenberg (born April 1, 1981 in Malibu, California) is an American world junior champion in contract bridge. A Stanford computer science graduate, Greenberg was previously employed Bridge Base, Google, and Facebook. He currently resides in Menlo Park, California.

Bridge accomplishments

Awards
 ACBL King or Queen of Bridge 1999

Wins
 Grand National Teams Flight B 2001
 World Junior Teams Championship 2005, 2006
 South American Junior Championships 2007

Runners-up
 World University Team Cup 2006

References

External links
 

1981 births
American contract bridge players
Living people
People from Malibu, California
Stanford University alumni
Google employees